Marchei is an Italian surname. Notable people with the surname include:

Marco Marchei (born 1954), Italian long-distance runner
Valentina Marchei (born 1986), Italian figure skater

Italian-language surnames